Rogaška Slatina is a town in eastern Slovenia. It is the largest settlement and the seat of the Municipality of Rogaška Slatina. It is known for its curative mineral water, spa, and crystal glass.

Name
The name Rogaška Slatina literally means 'Rogatec springs', referring to a source of mineral water. The springs were dubbed Roitschocrene 'Rogatec springs' (< Greek κρήνη crene 'spring') in 1687 by Johann Benedikt Gründel. The settlement was known as Rohitsch-Sauerbrunn or Sauerbrunn Curort in German (and in older sources also Roitscher Sauerbrunn). Older sources also contain the Slovene names Slatina Zdravišče and Slatina Rogačka.

History

The Rogaška Slatina area was inhabited in antiquity, and a Roman road led to the settlement. A document from the Archbishopric of Salzburg dating from 1141 mentions a Roman stone next to a spring in the settlement. The 16th-century alchemist Leonhard Thurneysser was the first to describe the spring. The spring was also described by the imperial physician Paul de Sorbait in 1679, by the Carniolan physician Marko Gerbec circa 1700, and by Joseph Karl Kindermann in his 1798 history of Styria (Repertorium der steiermärkischen Geschichte, Geographie, Topographie, Statistik und Naturhistorie). The historian Rudolf Gustav Puff described Rogaška Slatina in a special publication, and 24 lithographs of the town were created by the artist Josip Reiterer in the early 19th century. The chemist Adolf Režek set up a small chemistry laboratory in Rogaška Slatina in 1931 and published various material about the town.

World War II
Between 1941 and 1945 Rogaška Slatina was occupied by Nazi Germany. The Wehrmacht's 132nd infantry division entered into health-spa resort on April 11, 1941, only five days after invasion of Yugoslavia. In the following weeks, the occupier's complex administration was set up, who transformed Rogaška Slatina because of its health and glassmaking importance, large accommodation capacity and position along the German-Croatian state border on the Sotla River into one of the key outposts of the Lower Styrian occupation zone. Daniel Siter in his thesis Rogaška Slatina during the period of German occupation (1941-1945) mentions the Croatian Nazi-collaborationists Ustashe (slov. Ustaši) 41 times, their presence during that time as well as their ravaging in the area well after WW2.

Mass graves
Rogaška Slatina is the site of two known mass graves from the period immediately after the Second World War. The Sovinec Ravine Mass Grave is located in the southeast part of the town, in a ravine above the railroad tracks. It contains the remains of 18 to 20 Croatians that were captured and then killed at the site in May and June 1945. The Flower Hill Mass Grave lies east of the town and is believed to occupy the entire ravine below the former Triglav Hotel. It contains the remains of an unknown number of victims murdered after the war and/or victims murdered by the Nazis during the war.

Spa

Rogaška Slatina is a synonym for health-resort tourism in Slovenia. For centuries the curative mineral water rich in magnesium (branded as Donat Mg), the picturesque countryside, and other local attractions have attracted visitors to the area. Roman inscriptions referring to the spa waters have been found. A wooden fence was built around the spring in the 17th century, and the water flowed through a wooden trough. The castle lord Peter de Curti built an inn at the site in 1676 and charged people to visit the springs. At that time the water was also bottled in bottles produced by a nearby glass works.

Churches

The parish church in the town is dedicated to the Holy Cross and belongs to the Roman Catholic Diocese of Celje. The current structure at the site was built between 1864 and 1866 in a Neo-Romanesque style. The earliest mention of a church at the site is in a manuscript from 1304, although the church predated that time. That building was Romanesque, and it was razed in 1863 to make way for today's church.

Another church, next to the village of Prnek, is dedicated to the Holy Trinity. It also belongs to the Parish of Rogaška Slatina. It was built in the 17th century and contains a gold-plated altar dating to between 1650 and 1675. The rest of the internal furnishings are from the 18th and 19th centuries.

Notable people
Notable people that were born or lived in Rogaška Slatina include:
Hilarij Froelich (1811–1878), medical writer
Franjo Kolterer (1888–1964), medical writer
Avgust Lavrenčič (1925–1996), painter and scenographer
Ela Peroci (1922–2001), children's writer
Miloš Verk (1890–1952), cartographer

References

External links

 Rogaška Slatina, the official travel guide to Slovenia
 Rogaška Slatina on Geopedia
 Rogaška Slatina municipal site

Populated places in the Municipality of Rogaška Slatina
Spa towns in Slovenia
Cities and towns in Styria (Slovenia)